The Linford Group was a construction company in England which specialised in the restoration of historic buildings. Its headquarters was in Lichfield, Staffordshire.

History
The company was founded as a family building business in 1877.

It changed its name to F. & E.V. Linford in 1925 and again to Linford Group in 1970. It acquired metalwork restorer Dorothea Restorations in 2007, and the following year bought plasterwork business Trumpers. The Linford Group was placed into administration in October 2011.

Operations
The company was involved in the following activities:
Building
Renewal
Restoration

References

Construction and civil engineering companies of England
Companies based in Lichfield
Construction and civil engineering companies established in 1877
1877 establishments in England
Defunct construction and civil engineering companies
British companies established in 1877
2011 disestablishments in England
British companies disestablished in 2011
Construction and civil engineering companies disestablished in 2011